Makaryevo is the name of several rural localities in Russia:
Makaryevo, Nizhny Novgorod Oblast, a settlement in Valkovsky Selsoviet of Lyskovsky District of Nizhny Novgorod Oblast
Makaryevo, Tver Oblast, a village in Nelidovsky District of Tver Oblast